Henry Brand may refer to:

Henry Brand, 1st Viscount Hampden (1814–1892), British politician
Henry Brand, 2nd Viscount Hampden (1841–1906), British politician